is a Japanese game show that aired Saturday nights from 19:00-19:54 JST on Fuji TV. It consisted of mostly logic puzzles and brain teasers. Some examples of the games are:

Kanji Puzzle
Match Sticks
Mis-match Manga
Spot the Difference

Each game ends with Shiro Ito getting hit by Moyatto Balls.

Video games

External links
Home page for IQ Supli

2006 video games
2007 video games

2004 Japanese television series debuts
2009 Japanese television series endings
Japanese game shows
Fuji TV original programming
Japan-exclusive video games
Nintendo DS games
Nintendo DS-only games
Spike (company) games
Video games developed in Japan